Taraval and 17th Avenue is an eastbound-only light rail stop on the Muni Metro L Taraval line, located in the Parkside neighborhood of San Francisco, California. The stop opened with the first section of the L Taraval line on April 12, 1919.

Service 
Since August 2020, service along the route is temporarily being provided by buses to allow for the construction of improvements to the L Taraval line. The project is expected to wrap up in 2024.

Proposed changes 

Like many stations on the line, 17th Avenue had no platforms; trains stopped at marked poles before the cross street, and passengers crossed travel lanes to board. In March 2014, Muni released details of the proposed implementation of their Transit Effectiveness Project (later rebranded MuniForward), which included a variety of stop changes for the L Taraval line. The 17th Avenue stop was one of several stops that would be eliminated to increase stop spacing and reduce travel time. On September 20, 2016, the SFMTA Board approved the L Taraval Rapid Project.

Early implementation of many changes, including stop eliminations, occurred on February 25, 2017. Only the outbound stop at 17th Avenue was eliminated; the inbound stop was temporarily kept in response to neighborhood concerns, as it is adjacent to a Safeway store. If further study indicated the stop should be retained, a concrete boarding island would be installed during the main construction phase beginning in 2018. In November 2017, Muni staff officially proposed to remove the stop. In December 2017, the SFMTA Board voted to eliminate the remaining inbound stops at 17th Avenue and 35th Avenue. The stop was to be temporarily closed from February to May 2018, during which time SFMTA staff would study the effects of the closure, and the board would make a final decision in mid-2018.

However, in response to community pressure to retain the stop, Muni released a revised proposal in January 2018. The 17th Avenue inbound stop would be retained; a boarding island east of 17th Avenue and an accessible platform to the west would be built during the project construction, with painted safety zones in the interim. That proposal also called for elimination of the inbound stop at 15th Avenue and Taraval, and for Ulloa and Forest Side to be moved one block west to 14th Avenue. The SFMTA Board approved the plan in July 2018.

References

External links 

SFMTA: Taraval St & 17th Ave
SF Bay Transit (unofficial): Taraval St & 17th Ave

Muni Metro stations
Railway stations in the United States opened in 1919